Troy High School is a public high school located in Troy, Rensselaer County, New York, U.S.A., and is the only high school operated by the Enlarged City School District of Troy, NY. The Troy Flying Horses football team are 4 time, one time NYS Class A (1996) and three time NYS Class AA State Champions, first in 1998 then back to back for the years 2017 and 2018.

Footnotes

Schools in Troy, New York
Public high schools in New York (state)